Shorea bentongensis (called, along with some other species in the genus Shorea, white meranti) is a species of tree in the family Dipterocarpaceae. It is endemic to Peninsular Malaysia, where it is threatened by habitat loss.

References

bentongensis
Endemic flora of Peninsular Malaysia
Trees of Peninsular Malaysia
Taxonomy articles created by Polbot